Linda Sheskey (born Linda Detlefsen on October 18, 1962, nka Linda Nicosia) is a retired middle distance runner from the United States. She competed in the 1980s and 90s for her native country. While running for the University of Georgia, she became the first women's NCAA champion for that school.  She was the 1986 National Champion at 1500 meters. She was also the 1989 Indoor champion both times representing Athletics West.  Sheskey set her personal best in the women's 1,500 metres event (4:04.89) on July 16, 1987, at the Meeting de Paris in Paris, France.  Later that year she was the Pan American Games champion.

International competitions

National titles
 USA Outdoor Track and Field Championships
 1500 m: 1986

References

External links
 Profile
 
 The 63rd July 4th Road Race(2022) Fifty Years of First Women

1962 births
Living people
American female middle-distance runners
Pan American Games track and field athletes for the United States
Pan American Games medalists in athletics (track and field)
Pan American Games gold medalists for the United States
Athletes (track and field) at the 1991 Pan American Games
Athletes (track and field) at the 1987 Pan American Games
World Athletics Championships athletes for the United States
Competitors at the 1986 Goodwill Games
Competitors at the 1990 Goodwill Games
Medalists at the 1987 Pan American Games
21st-century American women